Tourville was a 90-gun sail and steam ship of the line of the French Navy, lead ship of her class.

Career 

She took part in the Baltic theatre of the Crimean War, shelling Sweaborg on 10 August 1855. She later took part in the French Intervention in Mexico as a troop ship.

Put in ordinary in 1864. On the 30 May 1856 off the island of Marmora she collided with a British Government Troopship and horse carrier, the Argo returning troops from the Crimea, compelling the Argo to put in for repairs at Constantinople.

She was hulked in Cherbourg in 1871 to serve as a prison for survivors of the Paris Commune. Struck the next year, she was renamed to Nestor and eventually broken up in 1878.

Notes, citations, and references

Notes

Citations

References
 
 90-guns ships-of-the-line

Ships of the line of the French Navy
1853 ships